Water is known to have an impact on human body weight. Since water contains zero calories, consuming it with meals reduces total energy intake and aids in weight loss, particularly if it is taken instead of calorific drinks, such as juice or soft drinks.

See also
 Adipsia
 Anti-obesity medication
 Body water
 Diet
 Drinking water
 Water intoxication 
 Weight loss

References 

Water
Endocrinology
Obesity
Dietetics
Weight loss
Drinking water
Body water